St. Ansgar Township is a township in Mitchell County, Iowa, USA.

History
St. Ansgar Township was originally settled chiefly by Norwegians.

References

Townships in Mitchell County, Iowa
Townships in Iowa